Vĩnh Lộc is a district of Thanh Hóa province in the North Central Coast region of Vietnam. As of 2003 the district had a population of 87,219. The district covers an area of 157 km². The district capital lies at Vĩnh Lộc. The village is famous for the Citadel of the Hồ, a short-lived Vietnamese Dynasty (1400-1407), Hồ Quy, the founder of the Dynasty, having built the Citadel in 1397 and moved the capital there in 1401. Since 2011, the Citadel is part of UNESCO World Heritage Sites.

Administration
Vĩnh Lộc is administratively subdivided into 15 communes and 1 township:

Vĩnh Lộc Township
Commune of Vĩnh Thành
Commune of Vĩnh Quang
Commune of Vĩnh Yên
Commune of Vĩnh Tiến
Commune of Vĩnh Long
Commune of Vĩnh Phúc
Commune of Vĩnh Hưng
Commune of Vĩnh Minh
Commune of Vĩnh Khang
Commune of Vĩnh Hòa
Commune of Vĩnh Hùng
Commune of Vĩnh Tân
Commune of Vĩnh Ninh
Commune of Vĩnh Thịnh
Commune of Vĩnh An

References

Districts of Thanh Hóa province